The Paul VI Audience Hall also known as the Hall of the Pontifical Audiences is a building in Rome named for Pope  with a seating capacity of 6,300, designed in reinforced concrete by the Italian architect Pier Luigi Nervi and completed in 1971. It was constructed on land donated by the Knights of Columbus.

It lies partially in the Vatican City but mostly in Italy: the Italian part of the building is treated as an extraterritorial area of the Holy See, and is used by the Pope as an alternative to Saint Peter's Square when conducting his Wednesday morning General Audience. It is dominated by an  800-quintal (80-tonne) bronze/copper-alloy sculpture by Pericle Fazzini entitled  (Italian for The Resurrection). A smaller meeting hall, known as Synod Hall, is located in the building as well. This hall sits at the east end on a second floor.

Solar roof

On 25 May 2007, it was revealed that the roof of the building was to be covered with 2,400 photovoltaic panels, generating sufficient electricity to supply all the heating, cooling and lighting needs of the building throughout the year. The system was donated by SolarWorld, a German manufacturer, and valued at $1.5 million.  It was officially placed into service on 26 November 2008, and was awarded the 2008 European Solar Prize in the category for "Solar architecture and urban development".

Gallery

References

Further reading

 	

Pope Paul VI
Properties of the Holy See
Event venues in Vatican City
Religious action on climate change
Buildings and structures completed in 1971
1971 establishments in Vatican City
1971 establishments in Italy
Event venues in Italy
Modernist architecture in Italy
Pier Luigi Nervi buildings